Chitty on Contracts is one of the leading textbooks covering English contract law. The textbook is now in its 34th edition. The first editors were Joseph Chitty the Younger and Thompson Chitty, sons of Joseph Chitty.

Contents

Volume I – General Principles
Part I – Introduction
Part 2 – Formation of Contract
Chapter 2 – The Agreement, Chapter 3 – Consideration, Chapter 4 – Form, Chapter 5 – Mistake, Chapter 6 – Misrepresentation, Chapter 7 – Duress and Undue Influence
Part 3 – Capacity of Parties
Chapter 8 – Personal Incapacity, Chapter 9 – Corporations and Unincorporated Associations, Chapter 10 – The Crown, Public Authorities and the European Union, Chapter 11 – Political Immunity and Incapacity
Part 4 – The Terms of Contract
Chapter 12 – Express Terms, Chapter 13 – Implied Terms, Chapter 14 – Exemption Clauses, Chapter 15 – Unfair Terms in Consumer Contracts
Part 5 – Illegality and Public Policy:
Chapter 16 – Illegality and Public Policy
Part 6 – Joint Obligations, Third Parties, and Assignment
Chapter 17 – Joint Obligations, Chapter 18 – Third Parties, Chapter 19 – Assignment, Chapter 20 – Death and Bankruptcy
Part 7 – Performance and Discharge
Chapter 21 – Performance, Chapter 22 – Discharge By Agreement, Chapter 23 – Discharge By Frustration, Chapter 24 – Discharge By Breach, Chapter 25 – Other Modes of Discharge
Part 8 – Remedies for Breach of Contract
Chapter 26 – Damages, Chapter 27 – Specific Performance and Injunction, Chapter 28 – Limitation of Actions
Part 9 – Restitution
Part 10 – Conflict of Laws

Volume II – Specific Contracts
Chapter 31 – Agency 
Chapter 32 – Arbitration 
Chapter 33 – Bailment 
Chapter 34 – Bills of Exchange and Banking
Chapter 35 – Carriage By Air 
Chapter 36 – Carriage By Land 
Chapter 37 – Construction Contracts 
Chapter 38 – Credit and Security 
Chapter 39 – Employment 
Chapter 40 – Gambling Contracts 
Chapter 41 – Insurance 
Chapter 42 – Restrictive Agreements and Competition 
Chapter 43 – Sale of Goods 
Chapter 44 – Suretyship

See also
English contract law

Notes

English contract law